Raphitoma birmanica is an extinct species of sea snail, a marine gastropod mollusc in the family Raphitomidae.

Description

Distribution
Fossils of this extinct marine species were found in Miocene strata in Myanmar; age range: 23.03 to 20.43 Ma

References

External links
 E. Vredenburg. 1921. Comparative diagnoses of Pleurotomidae from the Tertiary formations of Burma. Records of the Geological Survey of India 53:83-129
 

birmanica
Gastropods described in 1921